If Tomorrow The War is the third full-length studio album by American rock band Constants. The album was released on September 7, 2010 through Science Of Silence Records (US) and Makemyday Records (worldwide). If Tomorrow The War was later released in a limited edition vinyl format through Interrobang Letterpress with alternate artwork designed by M. Repasch Nieves.

Track listing

Personnel
Will Benoit - vocals, guitar
Orion Wainer - bass
Rob Motes - drums
Justin K. Broadrick - production
Mike Hill - guest vocals on tracks 6 and 8
Comeback Kid - guest vocals on track 2

References

External links
Official website

2010 albums
Constants (band) albums